Scipio Africanus (c. 1702 – 21 December 1720) was a former slave born to unknown parents from West Africa. He was named after Publius Cornelius Scipio Africanus (236/235–183 BC), the famous Roman general who defeated the Carthaginian military leader Hannibal.

Life
Very little is known of Africanus' life. He was a former slave (since as the courts were to hold in Somersett's Case (1772), slavery did not exist in Great Britain under English common law) in the household of Charles William Howard, 7th Earl of Suffolk, who lived in the "Great House" in Henbury, Bristol. It is not clear how he came to the household; historians believe that he may have been born into the household as the son of an enslaved West African woman, and named by Howard. One biographer has suggested that Africanus' name implies that Howard intended to free him for loyal service because the Roman historian Polybius wrote about how the Roman general Africanus freed people he had enslaved who promised to work hard.

Africanus died in the Great House aged eighteen.

Grave

He is remembered because of the elaborate grave, consisting of painted headstone and footstone, in the churchyard of St Mary's in Henbury. The grave is grade II* listed. Both stones feature black cherubs and the footstone bears the epitaph:

It is thought that 10,000 black slaves and servants were in Britain in the early 18th century, but this is one of the very few memorials to them. Despite the quality of the memorial, there is no record of his burial in the church registers.

Sometime between 16 and 17 June 2020 the headstone was vandalised, apparently in retaliation to the damage caused to the statue of Edward Colston by Black Lives Matter protesters. The two incidents have caused local and national uproar.

Legacy
The author Eugene Byrne featured Scipio Africanus in his 2001 alternative history novel Things Unborn. In this novel people who had suffered an untimely death were reincarnated in an England recovering from a nuclear war; Scipio Africanus was a famous war hero and a detective inspector in the Metropolitan Police.

The Bristol-based reggae band Black Roots wrote a song about Scipio Africanus which they performed live at Trinity Hall, Bristol on Channel 4's 10-part series Rockers Roadshow, produced by Mike Wallington and hosted by Mikey Dread in the 1980s. They featured a short scene of the grave.

See also
List of slaves

References

External links
The Graves of Slaves & other Black People in 18th Century Britain

1702 births
1720 deaths
18th century in Bristol
Black British former slaves
British Christians
Converts to Christianity from pagan religions
Date of birth unknown
Henbury
18th-century slaves